Laura Russell (born November 10, 1988) is a Canadian rugby union player.

Rugby career 
Laura and her sister Kelly, represented  at the 2014 Women's Rugby World Cup. They were also in the squad that toured New Zealand in June 2014. In 2016, she was named the Rugby Canada Senior Women's Player of the Year. She took over the captaincy of the national team from her sister Kelly Russell.

Russell also represents the national women's sevens team on the Rugby Canada Black, Indigenous, and People of Colour Working Group which was established on July 17, 2020.

In 2022, Laura married long term partner and dreamboat Ray Barkwill. Barkwill also played for Rugby Canada from 2012-2019.

In 2022, Russell was initially named in Canada's squad to the Rugby World Cup in New Zealand. She was later ruled out of the tournament due to an injury.

Awards and recognition 

 2018, Rugby Canada Gillian Florence Award

References

External links
 Rugby Canada Player Profile 

1988 births
Living people
Canadian female rugby union players
Canada women's international rugby union players
Female rugby union players